The Greenland Commission operated between 1948 and 1950. It established the locally elected Provincial Council of Greenland and began the move towards home rule among the island's Danish settlers and Inuit natives.

History of Greenland
1948 establishments in Denmark